José Andrés Bilibio Estigarribia (born 2 January 1975 in Corrientes) is a retired naturalized Armenian football defender.

International career
He despite being born and raised in Argentina, now has dual nationality with Armenia. He has been a member of Armenia national football team and played 10 international matches between 2002 and 2003.

National team statistics

References

External links
Jose Andres Bilibio at BDFA 

1975 births
Living people
People from Corrientes
Argentine footballers
Armenian footballers
Armenia international footballers
Armenian people of Argentine descent
Sportspeople of Argentine descent
Club Atlético Los Andes footballers
FC Ararat Yerevan players
FC Pyunik players
Club Bolívar players
C.D. ESPOLI footballers
Coronel Bolognesi footballers
Tiro Federal footballers
Primera B Metropolitana players
Expatriate footballers in Bolivia
Argentine expatriate sportspeople in Bolivia
Expatriate footballers in Ecuador
Argentine expatriate sportspeople in Ecuador
Expatriate footballers in Peru
Argentine expatriate sportspeople in Peru
Armenian Premier League players
Deportivo Armenio footballers
Association football defenders
Sportspeople from Corrientes Province